The J. P. Bickell Memorial Award is named after the late Toronto businessman and hockey executive J. P. Bickell.  The award was created by the Maple Leaf Gardens board of directors to honor Mr. Bickell's involvement as owner, president, chairman and director of the club from 1924 - 1951. Mr. Bickell was part of seven Stanley cup victories, his name appearing 6 times. His name did not appear on the cup in 1942 while he was serving in the war overseas. 

Produced in 1953, the award was valued at $10,000, which makes it one of the costliest of all sports trophies, the Bickell Memorial Cup consists entirely of 14-karat gold on a silver base. The replica, which will become the property of the player given the award, also will be of 14-karat gold, and is valued at $500.

The inscription on the cup reads;

The award is to be presented at the discretion of the Toronto Maple Leafs directors to a member of the Toronto Maple Leafs organization who performed with a very high standard of excellence over a single season or several years either on the ice as a player or within the executive office or a combination of both.

Past recipients

 1953- Ted Kennedy 
 1954- Harry Lumley 
 1955- Ted Kennedy 
 1956- Tod Sloan 
 1957 to 1958 not awarded
 1959 George Armstrong & Bob Pulford
 1960 Johnny Bower
 1961 Red Kelly
 1962 Dave Keon
 1963 Dave Keon
 1964 Johnny Bower
 1965 Johnny Bower
 1966 Allan Stanley
 1967 Terry Sawchuk
 1968 not awarded
 1969 Tim Horton
 1970 not awarded
 1971 Bobby Baun
 1972 King Clancy
 1973 to 1978 not awarded
 1979 Mike Palmateer
 1980 to 1992 not awarded
 1993 Doug Gilmour
 1994 not awarded
 1995 Bob Davidson
 1996 to 1998 not awarded
 1999 Mats Sundin & Curtis Joseph
 2000 to 2002 not awarded
 2003 Pat Quinn
 2004 to 2017 not awarded
 2018 Ian Turnbull

References
 Leafs trophy winners

Specific

Canadian ice hockey trophies and awards
Toronto Maple Leafs
Ontario awards